The black-rumped buttonquail  (Turnix nanus) is a small species of bird in the buttonquail family.

Description
This species has a brown back, rufous chest, and pale belly, brown irises and a black rump. As usual for buttonquails but not for most birds, the female is larger and brighter than the male.  The birds are shy and difficult to flush.

Distribution and habitat
The species is found in open grassland through much of Africa outside the forested and more arid regions. It is resident in the central parts of the range but is a migratory breeder further north towards Lake Chad and the Central African Republic.

References

Madge and McGowan, Pheasants, Partridges and Grouse

External links
 Black-rumped buttonquail - Species text in The Atlas of Southern African Birds.

black-rumped buttonquail
Birds of Sub-Saharan Africa
black-rumped buttonquail
Taxonomy articles created by Polbot
Taxa named by Carl Jakob Sundevall